Brotherhood of the Rose is 1989 American two-part television miniseries directed by Marvin J. Chomsky, based on the novel The Brotherhood of the Rose by David Morrell. The novel was adapted by Gy Waldron.

Plot 
Brotherhood of the Rose tells the story of Saul and Chris, two orphans from Philadelphia. They are adopted by a man named Eliot, who treats the boys like his own children and raises them to become assassins. When a mission goes wrong for Saul, and Chris is involved in an international incident, they begin to question their lives and their missions, and start to see Eliot in a new light.

Cast

 Peter Strauss as Saul 
 David Morse as Chris
 Robert Mitchum as Eliot
 Connie Sellecca as Erika 
 James Sikking as Felix
 M. Emmet Walsh as Hardy
 James Hong as Col. Chan 
 Rhys McConnochie as Orlik 
 Robert Taylor as Pollux
 Brett Williams as Castor

Production

Filming
The majority of filming for the movie took place in New Zealand, with that country portraying numerous other world-wide locations.

Release
The film premiered on January 22, 1989 on NBC, following Super Bowl XXIII.

Reception
Its initial broadcast resulted in the two-part movie finishing as the highest-rated TV movie of the 1988-89 TV season. The first part was watched by 32 million viewers, and the second by 27.4 million.

References

External links

The Brotherhood of the Rose at The New York Times Movies

1980s American television miniseries
Films based on thriller novels
Films shot in New Zealand
Super Bowl lead-out shows
Films based on Canadian novels
NBC network original films
Films directed by Marvin J. Chomsky